"What Are They Doing in Heaven?" is a Christian hymn written in 1901 by American Methodist minister Charles Albert Tindley. , it has become popular enough to have been included in 16 hymnals.

The song has sometimes been recorded under the titles "What Are They Doing?" and "What Are They Doing in Heaven Today?". The question mark is often omitted. The song may also be known by its first line, "I am thinking of friends whom I used to know".

The song consists of four verses and a refrain, each four lines long. In both the verses and the refrain, the first three lines rhyme, and the fourth is "What are they doing now?" or some small variant of that. The author reflects on friends who were burdened in life by care, or by disease, or by poverty; and wonders what they might now be doing in Heaven, without giving his answer.

The first known recording of the song is the 1928 one by Washington Phillips (18801954; vocals and zither), in gospel blues style. Phillips' recording was used in the soundtrack of the 2005 film Elizabethtown. The song has since been recorded many times in a wide variety of styles, including gospel and bluegrass; sometimes attributed to Phillips or to "anonymous" or to "traditional".

Recordings 

 1928Washington Phillips, 78rpm single Columbia 14404-D
 1934Mitchell's Christian Singers, 78rpm singles Perfect 326, Banner 33433, Conqueror 8431, and Melotone 13400 
 1938Golden Gate Quartet, 78rpm singles Bluebird 7994  and Montgomery 7866 
 The Southernaires, radio broadcast 
 1946Pilgrim Travelers
 1948The Lilly Brothers, 78rpm single Page 505
 1948The Southern Harmonizers, 78 rpm single Specialty 301 
 1950The Mello-Tones, 78rpm single Columbia 39051  
 1950-53Silvertone Singers
 1952The Dixie Hummingbirds, 45rpm single Peacock Records 5-1594 
 1957Harry and Jeanie West  on the album Favorite Gospel Songs 
 1960Sister Rosetta Tharpe on the album Gospels in Rhythm 
 1962The Fairfield Four on the album The Bells Are Tolling 
 1964The Staple Singers on the album This Little Light 
 196692Marion Williams
 1971The Downtown Sister New Heaven on the album Gospels And Spirituals 
 1983Slim & the Supreme Angels on the album Glory to His Name 
 1992Tom Hanway on the album Tom Hanway and Blue Horizon 
 1994Martin Simpson  on the album A Closer Walk with Thee 
 1995The Pfister Sisters  on the album The Pfister Sisters 
 1996Michelle Lanchester, Bernice Johnson Reagon and Yasmeen  on the album Wade in the Water: African American Sacred Music Traditions 
 1996Little Jimmy Scott on the album Heaven 
 2000Last Forever  on the album Trainfare Home 
 2000Margaret Allison and the Angelic Gospel Singers on the album Home in the Rock 
 2002Jorma Kaukonen on the album Blue Country Heart
 2003Bill Gaither feat. Gloria Gaither and Babbie Mason on the album Heaven 
 2003The Immortal Lee County Killers on the album Love Is a Charm of Powerful Trouble 
 2003Mike "Sport" Murphy  on the album Uncle 
 2006Riley Baugus on the album Long Steel Rail 
 2006Joanne Blum  on the album Even More Love 
 2006Cabin Fever NW  on the album The Door Is Always Open 
 2006Jessy Dixon on the album Get Away Jordan 
 2006Vince Gill on the album Voice of the Spirit, Gospel of the South 
 2006The Be Good Tanyas on the album Hello Love
 2006Boxcar Preachers  on the album Auto-Body Experience 
 2006Judy Cook  on the album If You Sing Songs ... 
 2006The Great Gospel Crew  on the album The Greatest Gospel Music 
 2007John Reischman and The Jaybirds  on the album Stellar Jays 
 2008Murry Hammond on the album I Don't Know Where I'm Going but I'm on My Way 
 2009Jim Byrnes on the album My Walking Stick 
 2009The Habit  on the album The Habit 
 2010Buddy Greene on the album A Few More Years 
 2011The Bright Wings Chorus  on the album '' 
 2011Dead Rock West on the album Bright Morning Stars 
 2013The Quiet American  on the album Wild Bill Jones  2013Marcy Marxer on the album Things Are Coming My Way 
 2013Mogwai on the album Les Revenants 2013Mavis Staples on the album One True Vine 2013Colin Stetson feat. Justin Vernon on the album New History Warfare, Vol. 3: To See More Light 
 2014Béla Fleck and Abigail Washburn on the album Béla Fleck and Abigail Washburn''

References 

American Christian hymns
Blues songs
Gospel songs
Songs about death
Hymns by Charles Albert Tindley
1901 songs
Washington Phillips songs
Columbia Records singles
Pace Jubilee Singers songs
20th-century hymns